American actress and singer Hailee Steinfeld has released two extended plays, twenty singles (including nine as a featured artist), three promotional singles and has made other album appearances. Steinfeld gained recognition for her music after performing "Flashlight" in Pitch Perfect 2 (2015).

Steinfeld's debut extended play, Haiz, was released on November 13, 2015, by Republic Records. The lead single, "Love Myself" was released on August 7, 2015, to positive reviews. The single found commercial success charting on the Billboard Pop Songs chart at number 27 (later peaking at 15), marking the highest debut for a solo female artist on the chart in 17 years, since the Natalie Imbruglia single "Torn" entered at number 26 in 1998. "Love Myself" also peaked at number 30 on the Billboard Hot 100. Haiz was re-released twice in 2016. With the first re-release, a new version of the song "Rock Bottom" (with American funk-pop band DNCE) was released as the second single and reached number 33 on the Billboard Pop Songs chart. With the second re-release, Steinfeld added "Starving" (with Grey and featuring Zedd); the song found commercial and critical success and reached number 12 on the Billboard Hot 100.

Following 2016, Steinfeld made appearances on multiple soundtracks including "Capital Letters" from Fifty Shades Freed (2018), "Back to Life" from Bumblebee (2018) and "Afterlife" from Dickinson (2019). She also released a string of successful singles in 2017 which included "Most Girls" and "Let Me Go" reaching number 58 and 40 on the Billboard Hot 100 respectively. In 2019, Steinfeld featured on Drax Project's "Woke Up Late". In May 2020, Steinfeld released her second extended play, Half Written Story which received generally mixed reviews and was supported by the singles "Wrong Direction" and "I Love You's".

Extended plays

Singles

As lead artist

As featured artist

Promotional singles

Other charted songs

Other appearances

Music videos

Notes

References

Pop music discographies
Discographies of American artists
Discography